Rimon School of Music is a contemporary music school in Ramat Hasharon, Israel.
It is Israel's largest independent professional school for advanced study of jazz, R&B, bebop, rock, and pop music.  Many of its graduates have become well-known music professionals and performers throughout the world.

The Rimon School is respected for its academic excellence and wide range of opportunities for artistic expression. Rimon's reputation for creative expression and community building also attracts a roster of visiting artists and industry professionals.

The school was established in 1985, by a group of Berklee graduate Israeli musicians with the intention of making modern music more prominent in Israel.

Programs
Rimon's curriculum develops musicianship and social influence through a variety of studies, experiences, and real-world projects. Students may choose to study in Conducting/Arranging/Composition, Performance, Songwriting, Contemporary Music Production, Electronic Music Production, Music Education, The Rimon Jazz Institute, and The First Year in English Program (for international students).

In 1992, Rimon formed an articulation and credit transfer agreement with the Berklee College of Music. Many students who attend Rimon elect to continue their studies to earn a bachelor's or a master's degree internationally.

The school is also partnered with Berklee Institute for Creative Entrepreneurship (BerkleeICE) to create an ongoing incubator and professional development series centered around music technology and innovation.  The school also welcomes students from all over the world to study for one year at Rimon, in a full curriculum of music courses taught in the English language.

Notable alumni and faculty
Tom Oren
Netta Barzilai
Aviv Geffen
Ori Naftaly
Vira Lozinsky

See also
Music of Israel
Culture of Israel
Education in Israel

External links
 Youtube channel
 Facebook page

References

1985 establishments in Israel
Educational institutions established in 1985
Music schools in Israel
Ramat HaSharon